Cape Conway is a coastal locality in the Whitsunday Region, Queensland, Australia.

Geography 
The entire locality is within Conway National Park. The land is mountainous and undeveloped bushland. High Mountain was originally noted as High Peak on a chart by Lieutenant Francis Price Blackwood (Royal Navy) in HMS Fly in 1843.

History 
The locality name derives from the geographic feature Cape Conway which was named on 3 June 1770 by Lieutenant James Cook on the HM Bark Endeavour after Henry Seymour Conway, the Secretary of State for the Southern Department from 1765 to 1766 and Secretary of State for the Northern Department from 1766 to 1768.

References 

Whitsunday Region
Coastline of Queensland
Localities in Queensland